The Five Mile House is a former pub on Old Gloucester Road, Duntisbourne Abbots, Gloucestershire, England.
It was built in the 17th century and is grade II listed.

The pub was on the Campaign for Real Ale's National Inventory of Historic Pub Interiors.

The inn is on the old Roman road of Ermin Street. Documents found from 1891 and 1903 referred to the pub as the Old Inn.

The Five Mile House was owned and operated by the Ruck family from the 1930s until Ivy Ruck's death in 1995. The pub had bare wood floors, open fires and wooden seating, with a small bar leading through to the tap room.

The pub was bought and refurbished by the Carrier family, and reopened in 1997. It closed in 2015,  after the re-routing of the A419 had diverted much of the passing custom away. The building was converted into a private residence.

References

Former pubs in Gloucestershire
Grade II listed pubs in Gloucestershire
National Inventory Pubs
Commercial buildings completed in the 17th century
Pubs in Gloucestershire